Giuseppe Piazzi (2 September 1907 – 5 August 1963) was an Italian bishop who led the Diocese of Crema and then the Diocese of Bergamo.

Life 
Born in Casalbuttano, he was ordained priest in 1932 for the Diocese of Cremona. From 1942 to 1950 he was the parish priest  of Saint'Ilario in Cremona, where he was held in custody for a brief time by the authorities of the Italian Social Republic for his support for the partisans.
In 1950 pope Pius XII named him Bishop of Cremona, and in 1953 he was appointed bishop of Bergamo. As Bishop of Bergamo, he decided to renovate the diocesan seminary, and he started the fraternal relationship between his diocese and the city of Cochabamba.
He died in Engelberg.

References

External links and additional sources
 (for Chronology of Bishops) 
 (for Chronology of Bishops) 

1907 births
1963 deaths
Bishops of Bergamo
20th-century Italian Roman Catholic bishops
Bishops of Cremona